Football at the Central African Games was an event held 3 times for national football (soccer) teams in Central Africa. Possibly served twice as qualifying section for the African Games.

Results

Most wins

Precedent games
Precedent games before the Central African Games were helds in central Africa. The Jeux de la Coupe des Tropiques from 1962 to 1964 and the Central African Cup in 1972.

References

External links
RSSSF

Football
Central African Games
Central